Mercy Eke  is a Nigerian media personality, actress, video vixen and entrepreneur from Imo State. She won season 4 of Big Brother Naija in October 2019, becoming the first woman to win the reality show. She is the founder of Mnm luxury.

On 14 March 2020, Eke received the Africa Magic Viewers' Choice Award for Best Dressed Female.

Early life  
Eke is from Imo State, Nigeria. She attended Egbu Girls Secondary School in Owerri and graduated from Imo State University in 2014. Eke appeared as a vixen in the music video for Davido and Ichaba's single "Baby Mama". She also appeared in the music video for Airboy's song "Nawo Nawo". Eke auditioned for Big Brother Naija four times before becoming a contestant.

Career
Eke entered the Big Brother Naija house on 30 June 2019. She was announced as the winner in October 2019, becoming the first woman to win the show.

After winning season 4 of Big Brother Naija, Eke became an ambassador and influencer for various organizations. In 2020, she made her acting debut in the Nollywood film Fate of Alakada. Eke has also appeared in short comedy skits alongside a few Nigerian comedians.

Business deals
Eke has signed endorsement deals and become a brand ambassador for numerous brands, including Ciroc and Mr.Taxi. She also launched her own clothing line MnM Luxury.

Filmography

Music videos

Awards and nominations

References

External links 
Mercy Eke Twitter page

Big Brother (franchise) winners
1990 births
Living people
Actresses from Imo State
Big Brother (franchise) contestants
Nigerian businesspeople
Imo State University alumni
Igbo actresses
Nigerian women in business
Nigerian film actresses
21st-century Nigerian actresses